This is a list of abbreviations commonly used by booksellers.

ABA: Antiquarian Booksellers' Association
ABAA: Antiquarian Booksellers' Association of America
A.e.g.: All edges gilt.
A.e.s.: All edges stained.
A.L.s.: Autograph letter, signed.
ARC: Advance reading copy.
BCE: Book Club edition.
Bd.: Bound.
Bdg.: Binding.
Bds.: Boards.
B.e.p.: Back endpaper.
B.f.e.p.: Back free endpaper.
B.L.: Blackletter.
BOMC: Book-of-the-Month Club.
c. or ca.: Circa; around/about (referring to date)
C. & p.: Collated and perfect.
Cf.: Calf.
Cl.: Cloth.
CR or CPR or ©: Copyright
CWO: Check or cash with order.
Dec.: Decorated.
D.j.: Dust jacket.
D.S.: Document signed. 
DW: Dustwrapper (same as dust jacket, or book jacket) 
Ed.: Edition or editor.
Endp. or e.p.: Endpaper.
Eng. or engr.: Engraved(ing).
Ex-lib: Ex-Library copy, a book once held in library. Not to be confused with Ex Libris. 
Ex Libris: From the library of, referring to previous owner—often found on bookplates.
F: Fine condition.
Facs.: Facsimile. 
F.e.p.: Front endpaper.
F.f.e.p.: Front free endpaper.
FL: Flyleaf 
Frontis. or front. or fp.: Frontispiece.
G: Good condition.
G. or gt.: Gilt.
G.e.: Gilt edges.
HC/HCV: Hardcover.
Hf. bd.: Half bound. 
Illus. or ills. or ill.: Illustrated. 
IOBA: Independent Online Booksellers Association
Litho: Lithograph.
Ltd. Ed.: Limited Edition.
M.e.: Marbled edges.
Mco., mor.: Morocco leather.
MS(S). Manuscript(s).
N.d.: No date.
NF: Near Fine condition.
N.p.: No place, publisher, or printer. 
N.p.c.: not price clipped (of the jacket).
NYR or NYP: Not Yet Released or Not Yet Published
OSI: Out of Stock Indefinitely
O.p.: Out-of-Print.
P.b. or p.p.b.: Paperback.
P.c.: price clipped (of the jacket).
Pl(s).: Plate(s).
P.P.: Privately printed.
pp: Pages; p (and then the number) for page; pp for plural pages.
PPD: Postpaid.
Pr.: Printing.
Pseud.: Pseudonym.
Pub(d).: Publisher/published.
REP: Rear endpaper.
RFEP: Rear free endpaper.
RET: Returnable
SLC or SC: Slipcase 
SGD: Signed 
T.e.g.: Top edge gilt.
T.L.s.: Typed letter, signed.
T.p.: Title-page.
TS.: Typescript.
Vol. or vols.: Volume/volumes.
VG: Very Good condition.
W.a.f.: With all faults.

See also
Book size
List of used book conditions

References

Booksellers
Bookselling